Niles Scott (born September 30, 1995) is an American football nose tackle for the DC Defenders of the XFL. He played college football at Frostburg State.

College career
Scott played four seasons for Division III Frostburg State, where he recorded 150 tackles, 43 of them for loss, and 25 sacks. During his senior season, Scott recorded 16.5 tackles for a loss, 10 sacks and 51 total tackles and was named First-team AP Little All-America, the D3football.com All-America Second-team and the D3football.com All-East Region Defensive Player of the Year. Additionally, Scott was one of only three Division III players to be named to the 2018 SPIRAL Tropical Bowl.

Professional career

San Francisco 49ers
Scott signed with the San Francisco 49ers as an undrafted free agent on April 28, 2018. He was released on September 1, 2018, after failing to make the final 53-man roster at the end of training camp. He was signed to the 49ers' practice squad but was released by the team on September 6, 2018.

Denver Broncos
Scott was signed to the Denver Broncos practice squad on September 11, 2018. He was released by the team but subsequently re-signed to the practice squad on October 9, 2018.

Cincinnati Bengals
Scott was signed to the Cincinnati Bengals active roster off the Broncos practice squad on November 22, 2018. Scott made his NFL debut on November 25, 2018, against the Cleveland Browns, making two tackles in the Bengals 35–20 loss. In his rookie season Scott played in six games, making four tackles.

On August 8, 2019, Scott was placed on injured reserve with a foot injury.

Buffalo Bills
On August 2, 2020, Scott was signed by the Buffalo Bills. He was waived/injured on August 16, 2020, and subsequently reverted to the team's injured reserve list the next day. He was waived from injured reserve with an injury settlement on August 25, 2020.

Las Vegas Raiders 
On December 14, 2020, Scott signed with the practice squad of the Las Vegas Raiders. He signed a reserve/future contract on January 5, 2021.

On August 31, 2021, Scott was waived by the Raiders and re-signed to the practice squad the next day. He was released on September 6.

Tennessee Titans
On November 2, 2021, Scott was signed to the Tennessee Titans practice squad. He was released on November 23.

New England Patriots
On November 26, 2021, Scott was signed to the New England Patriots practice squad, but was released four days later.

Seattle Seahawks
On December 8, 2021, Scott was signed to the Seattle Seahawks practice squad. He signed a reserve/future contract with the Seahawks on January 10, 2022. He was released on May 3, 2022.

Miami Dolphins
On August 15, 2022, Scott signed with the Miami Dolphins. He was waived on August 29 and re-signed to the practice squad. He was released off the practice squad on September 5, 2022.

DC Defenders 
On November 17, 2022, Scott was drafted by the DC Defenders of the XFL.

References

External links
Forstburg State Bobcats bio
Cincinnati Bengals bio

1995 births
Living people
American football defensive tackles
Buffalo Bills players
Cincinnati Bengals players
DC Defenders players
Denver Broncos players
Frostburg State Bobcats football players
Las Vegas Raiders players
Miami Dolphins players
New England Patriots players
People from Elkton, Maryland
Players of American football from Maryland
San Francisco 49ers players
Seattle Seahawks players
Sportspeople from the Delaware Valley
Tennessee Titans players